"On My Way" is a song by Australian indie pop band, Sheppard. The song was released in Australia on 1 February 2019 as one of the ten competing entries in Eurovision - Australia Decides; in an attempt to represent Australia in the Eurovision Song Contest 2019. Eurovision - Australia Decides took place on 9 February 2019 and Sheppard performed the song 7th in the running order and placed third behind "2000 and Whatever" by Electric Fields and the winner "Zero Gravity" by Kate Miller-Heidke.

Ahead of the song's release, George Sheppard said "Luckily we already had a song written which was perfect for Eurovision. It has the classic massive, anthemic Sheppard sound, celebrating love and the fire that burns within you when you're in love. We are also planning an epic performance using technology and colour and light to tell the story in an interesting, unique way."

Critical reception
Peter Tuscan from The Music Network said "the track is dripping with Sheppard's textbook gang vocals, four-on-the-floor grooves and overall pop goodness."

Track listing
Digital download
"On My Way" – 3:23

Charts

Release history

References

2019 singles
Sheppard (band) songs
Songs written by Jon Hume

2019 songs